The Orange Line is a proposed north-south light rail line that will serve the central spine of Austin from North Lamar to Stassney Lane. It is in the planning stages as a part of Capital Metro's Project Connect. It is estimated to begin revenue service as early as 2029.

History
A contract for preliminary engineering work along the line was approved on March 20, 2019. In 2020, the planned route was truncated in length to reduce construction costs, with bus bridges providing connectivity through the rest of the corridor. Potential future phases may extend the line north to Tech Ridge and south to Slaughter as initially envisioned — those alignments are expected to be included in National Environmental Policy Act processing to allow for conversion to light rail in the future.

Route
The Orange Line will operate from North Lamar Transit Center to Stassney & Congress, and will follow the current route of the Capital MetroRapid 801 or a similar alignment. It is planned to run along The Drag.

Future extensions to the line would feature stations at Tech Ridge, Parmer, Braker, Rundberg, William Cannon, and Slaughter.

Stations

Stations are listed north to south.

References

External links
Map and fact sheet A
Fact sheet B

Capital Metro
Light rail in Texas
Rail transportation in Austin, Texas
Transportation in Travis County, Texas
Proposed railway lines in Texas
2029 in rail transport